Sport7 was a Bulgarian sports television channel, owned by TV7 Group along with its sister channels TV7, News7 and Super7. The channel was first launched in 2008 as a jointventure of TV7 and the cable TV broadcaster Cabletel. It aired sports events like La Liga, Serie A, Formula One, GP2 Series and others. It was closed down on 31 May 2009, as Cabletel withdrew from operating the channel.

Television networks in Bulgaria
Bulgarian-language television stations
Television channels and stations established in 2008
Television channels and stations disestablished in 2009